Gymkhana Ground is a multi purpose ground in Bengaluru, Karnataka. The ground is mainly used for organizing matches of football, cricket and other sports. The ground is one of the oldest cricket venues in Bengaluru and India. Previously, the ground is known as Rajendrasinhji Stadium. The ground hosted its match when Bangalore cricket team played against Madras cricket team.

The stadium has hosted eight Ranji Trophy matches from 1935 when Mysore cricket team played against Madras cricket team until 1952 but since then the stadium has hosted non-first-class matches.

References

External links 
 Cricketarchive
 Cricinfo

Cricket grounds in Karnataka
Sports venues in Bangalore
Sports venues completed in 1888
1888 establishments in India